Casey Donovan may refer to:

 Casey Donovan (singer), (born 1988) female Australian singer
 Casey Donovan (actor), (1943–1987) gay male pornographic performer, born John Calvin Culver